Dil Bekaraar  is an Indian romantic comedy streaming television series directed by Habib Faisal based on the 2013 novel Those Pricey Thakur Girls by Anuja Chauhan.  The series stars Akshay Oberoi, Sahher Bambba, Anjali Anand, Raj Babbar, Padmini Kolhapure, Sukhmani Sadana and Poonam Dhillon. The series was premiered on Disney+ Hotstar on November 26, 2021.

Plot 
Set in the 80s, the 10-episode series Dil Bekaraar revolves around the day-to-day shenanigans of Justice LN Thakur, his wife Mamta and their alphabetically named five daughters Anjini, Binodini, Chandu, Debjani and Eshwari.

Cast 

 Akshay Oberoi as Dylan Shekhawat
 Sahher Bambba as Debjani
 Raj Babbar as LN Thakur
 Poonam Dhillon as Mamta Thakur
 Anjali Anand as Binodini Thakur
 Sukhmani Sadana as Anjini Thakur
 Medha Shankar as Eshwari Thakur
 Chandrachur Singh as Hardik Motla (Health Minister)
 Aditya Kapadia as Gulgul
 Pankaj Kalra as AN Thakur
 Padmini Kolhapure as Bhudevi
 Apeksha Porwal as Mitali 
 Suhel Seth
 Tej Sapru as Sahas Shekhawat
 Sonali Sachdev as Juliet Shekhawat
^ Surabhi Tiwari as Aap aur Hum Host
 Alekh Angal
 Arjun Berry
 Shataf Figar as Amitabh Bose

Episodes

Production 
In 2019, Star India had commissioned the series adaptation of Anuja Chauhan's 2013 novel Those Pricey Thakur Girls for its then streaming service Hotstar under the newly created label Hotstar Specials as the rights for the adaptation was rebound to Chauhan.

Casting
In early July 2021, Medha Shankar was reportedly cast in the series. By the end of July 2021, casting was completed for the lead roles.

Release 
All episodes of the series were premiered on Disney+ Hotstar in India, on Hulu in the United States and on Hotstar globally on November 26, 2021.

Promotion
The series was unveiled by Disney+ Hotstar as part of the SpecialsX21 line-up along. The first teaser was released in early November 2021 followed by the trailer.

Reception  
Archika Khurana of The Times Of India rated the series three out of five and overall praised the story ‘Dil Bekaraar,’ with its family drama and romance set in the era of telegrams, typewriters, Doordarshan, and Campa Cola, will definitely take you down the memory lane while recreating the 80s magic. It's enjoyable! . Biswadeep Ghosh of National Herald noted that Dil Bekaraar will make us yearn for those lost years from not-so-far-back in time and might end up binge-watching it on a weekday. Nandini Ramnath of Scroll.in highly praised the performance of the cast and the story that recalls the 80s India. Shreemayee Das of Firstpost noted that the series did a great job of building the world of DD, Campa Cola, and imported perfume and with the help of the opening theme and credits the audience would be immediately placed in that world.

References

External links 

 

Hindi-language Disney+ Hotstar original programming
Indian web series
Hindi-language web series
Indian drama web series
2021 web series debuts